Martina Hingis and Maria Kirilenko were the defending champions, but Hingis retired on November 1, 2007, and Kirilenko teamed up with Ágnes Szávay.

Květa Peschke and Rennae Stubbs won in the final 6–1, 5–7, [10–7], against Cara Black and Liezel Huber.

Seeds
The top four seeds receive a bye into the second round.

Draw

Finals

Top half

Bottom half

External links
Main Draw

2008 Qatar Ladies Open - Doubles
2008 WTA Tour
2008 in Qatari sport